Hohnstein/Südharz is a former Verwaltungsgemeinschaft ("collective municipality") in the district of Nordhausen, in Thuringia, Germany. The seat of the Verwaltungsgemeinschaft was in Ilfeld (part of Harztor). It was disbanded in July 2018.

The Verwaltungsgemeinschaft Hohnstein/Südharz consisted of the following municipalities:
Buchholz 
Harztor
Harzungen 
Herrmannsacker 
Neustadt/Harz

References

Former Verwaltungsgemeinschaften in Thuringia